Microbrachis  is an extinct genus of lepospondyl amphibian from the Carboniferous Kladno Formation of the Czech Republic.

Description 
 
It had minute limbs, and probably swam using fish-like lateral body movements. Microbrachis probably fed on fresh water plankton such as shrimp. Microbrachis was pedomorphic, retaining its larval gills in adulthood. Similar traits are found in the extant axolotl.

References

Further reading 
 Andrew R. Milner, "The Tetrapod Assemblage from Nýrany, Czechoslovakia", in Systematics Association Special Volume No.15, "The Terrestrial Environment and the Origin of Land Vertebrates", ed. by A. L. Panchen, 1980, pp. 439–496, Academic Press, London and New York

External links 
 Microbrachis, The Type Microsaur (abstract)

Microsauria
Carboniferous amphibians of Europe
Kasimovian genus first appearances
Gzhelian genus extinctions
Prehistoric amphibian genera
Fossils of the Czech Republic
Fossil taxa described in 1875